Francoeur was a Canadian television series, first aired by TFO in 2003. It was the first Franco-Ontarian téléroman. The series has produced 44 episodes to date.

The series revolves around the Francoeurs, a Franco-Ontarian family in Eastern Ontario running a family farm. Written by Guy Boutin and directed by Derek Diorio, it was created and produced by Robert Charbonneau (who would later create TFO's first sitcom, Météo+).

The series has also aired on Télévision de Radio-Canada across the country.

Cast
Marc Bélanger as Luc Francoeur
Guy Mignault as Bernard Francoeur
Annie Lefebvre as Josée Francoeur
Louise Nolan as Monique Francoeur
Olivier L'Écuyer as Paul-André Francoeur
Lina Blais as Sophie Pouliot
Yan England as Joey Nadeau
Jimmy Changue as Bernard Nadeau 
Kim Bubbs as Gabrielle Létourneau
Roch Castonguay as Henri Létourneau
Renaud Lacelle-Bourdon as Pascal Létourneau
Karen Racicot as Bérengère Laliberté
Eugénie Gaillard as Chloé Marchand
François Grisé as Laurent Dorval
Vincent Poirier as Guillaume Bérubé
Colombe Demers as Karine Lorrain
Raymond Accolas as Gilles Péloquin
Maxime Cournoyer as Richard Lalonde

External links
 Francoeur

Téléromans
TFO original programming
Ici Radio-Canada Télé original programming
2003 Canadian television series debuts
Television shows set in Ontario
Television shows filmed in Ontario
2000s Canadian drama television series